Ranipur Barsi is a village situated in the Nakur Mandal  of  Saharanpur District in Uttar Pradesh, India. It is about 24.02 km far from the mandal headquarters at Nakur, and is 474 kilometres from the state capital at Lucknow. Most of the population belong to the Jat community.

Villages nearby include Barsi (0 km), Landhaura (2.2 km), Dhola Fatehpur (2.2 km), Tikraul (2.8 km), Manohara (2.9 km), Dadanpur (3.0 km), and Madhopur (3.4 km).

References 

Villages in Saharanpur district